Nürnberger Rostbratwurst, literally "Nuremberg grilled sausage", is a partially boiled German sausage, typical of the city of Nuremberg.

History 
The recipe is very old: according to historical sources it dates back to 1300. It seems that the poet Johann Wolfgang Goethe also loved Nürnberger Bratwürste, so much so that he had them sent by mail to Weimar.

Characteristics 
Small and thin and light in color (Bratwurst), the weight is about twenty grams for about 7–9 centimeters in length and 2 centimeters in diameter. Produced with pork without tendons and rind as well as bacon, Nuremberg sausages are flavored with marjoram. Other aromas include pepper, chervil, cardamom, ginger and lemon, as well as salt, the various mixtures vary according to the producer. The casing used is made of sheep.

Protected designation of origin 
Nürnberger Rostbratwurst is protected throughout the European Union as a "protected geographical indication" (PGI). This means that products sold within the EU as Nürnberger Rostbratwurst can only be produced in the city of Nuremberg.

Consumption 
A typical preparation of them is well roasted on the grill and placed three at a time between two slices of bread, seasoned with mustard and sauerkraut. This is also the way they can be found in the many kiosks in Nuremberg that offer snacks. If they are eaten as a main meal, they are accompanied by sauerkraut, potato salad or horseradish.

References

Related articles 

 Currywurst
 Choucroute alsaziana
 Hot dog
 Leberkäse
 Leberwurst
 Thüringer Rostbratwurst
 Weißwurst
Street food
Nuremberg
German sausages
Cooked sausages